Omorgus borrei is a species of hide beetle in the subfamily Omorginae.

References

borrei
Beetles described in 1872